Malar may refer to:

Places

Tamil Nadu, India
 Malarajamkuppam, Kandamangalam block, Viluppuram Taluk, Viluppuram District
 Malarasankuppam, Gingee Taluk, Viluppuram District
 Thirumalarajapuram, Poonamallee Taluk, Thiruvallur District
 Thirumalaraya Samudram, Pudukkottai Taluk, Pudukkottai

Elsewhere
 Malar, Iran, a city in Iran
 Malar, Mazandaran, a village in Iran
 Malar, Pakistan, a town in Pakistan
 Malar, Bap, a desert panchayat village in Bap tehsil, Jodhpur District, Rajasthan, India
 Malar, Bhopalgarh, a panchayat village in Bhopalgarh tehsil, Jodhpur District, Rajasthan, India
 Mälaren, also known as Lake Malar, the third largest lake in Sweden
 St Mathias, Goa, also called Malar; a village in Goa, India

People
 Augustín Malár (1894–1945), a Slovak general during the Second World War
 Joanne Malar, Canadian swimmer
 Malar, a character in the 2015 film Premam, portrayed by Sai Pallavi

Other
 Relating to the cheek (from Latin)
 Malar rash, a disease sign consisting of a butterfly-shaped rash on the cheeks and nose
 Malar bone, the zygomatic bone
 Malar (Forgotten Realms), a deity in the Forgotten Realms campaign setting of Dungeons & Dragons